Spotify Live, formerly Spotify Greenroom, is a social audio app from Spotify, which allows the user to host or participate in a live-audio virtual environment called room for conversation. The current capacity of a room is limited to 1000 people. The app is available for Android and iOS. It rivals Twitter Spaces and Clubhouse that belong to the same social media segment.

History 
In October 2020, Betty Labs released Locker Room exclusively for iOS app store. The app featured virtual audio chat rooms for sportsmen and fans. Later in late March 2021 Spotify acquired Betty Labs for 50 millions and announced plans to rebrand the app with a wider emphasis on sports, music and pop culture. On June 16, 2021, Spotify released the app as Spotify Green room on Android (early access) and iOS. This time, the application is no longer limited to sports.

At launch, the Spotify Greenroom Creator Fund was created to fund creators and shows. It's a rival to Clubhouse's Creator First Accelerator Program. The fund is meant to provide a monetization path for podcasters who integrate Greenroom into their verified Spotify accounts.

As of July 2021, the app had over 140,000 iOS installs and 100,000 Android installs.

In August 2021, Spotify partnered with the WWE to create professional wrestling-related podcasts. Many of these will be recorded by The Ringer, Spotify's in-house podcasting team, using Greenroom.

In March 2022, Spotify Greenroom announced it would be rebranding as Spotify Live and moving to the main Spotify app.

Features 
Greenroom enables the user to create or join a room. In terms of the application, a room is a virtual place where people can voice chat in real-time. The user is only permitted to create a room under a group. The groups are pre-defined by the application and represent either a brand or a generic category as its name indicates. If a user chooses to create a room, that person will be the host of the room. A host can invite people into the room and decide who can talk. The host can enable the recording and Discussions tab in the room while creating it. If the recording is enabled in a room, a disclaimer will be displayed in the room to inform other users that the conversation is being recorded. Audio recorded in mp4 format will be sent to the host by email after the room is completed. If the Discussions tab is enabled, users can send text messages to each other in the public chat section of the room. Also, the host can ban users from the room if necessary. If a user chooses to join a room, either the person can choose to remain as a listener or request the host to become a speaker. Users have the right to follow or block any other user as they see fit. Users may also join any group as they see fit. Users will receive a notification when new rooms are created in groups that they belong to. The user can find new users and groups using the search tab.

Partnered Creators 
By October 2021, Spotify has a variety of partnered creators meant to help boost traffic and prove its vertically integrated podcast model. These creators largely focus on Generation Z. In-house Spotify talent like The Ringer bring sports-related content. Meanwhile, the company recruited creators from across other social channels to build Greenroom's audience while also promoting its integration with Spotify and Anchor. Each verified Spotify partner has their Greenroom shows featured in both the Greenroom app and their profiles on the Spotify app. This is part of the company's lead-in to the 2022 ramp up to compete with Clubhouse.

Platforms 
Spotify Greenroom app available on Android and iOS platforms. Users can download the App from their respective stores. The Android customer requires Android 8 or above to launch the app. iOS consumers need iOS 13 or later to run the app.

As of August 2021, the Android version still lacks many features of the iOS version, including the ability to give gems, participate in chat, click hyperlinks, and link social media accounts. Most users on the Android platform are unable to use the app at all, leaving hundreds of 1 star reviews on the Google play store.

References

External links 
 

Live
IOS software
Social audio
Mobile applications
2020 software
Internet culture
Social networking services
Android (operating system) software